Elburton is a small suburb of Plymstock, part of the City of Plymouth in the English county of Devon. It lies on the south eastern edge of Plymouth and is a gateway up the South Hams.

Geography 

Elburton has a small shopping area with a supermarket, newsagent, post office, butchers, and a variety of fast food restaurants. There are two pubs in the village as well as a garage.

Politics 

Elburton is contained within the Plymstock Dunstone ward of Plymouth City Council and is represented by Conservative Party councilor Nigel Churchill. Elburton inhabitants historically have voted Conservative in both local and national elections. 

There is also Elburton Primary School which was attended by England Cricket Captain Heather Knight.

References

Suburbs of Plymouth, Devon